Étienne Marie Chompré (1701-1784) was an 18th-century French writer. He wrote a Recueil de Fables et des Réflexions sur les attributs de la Fable.

His brother was Pierre Chompré, his nephew Nicolas Maurice Chompré.

Sources

18th-century French writers
18th-century French male writers
French educational theorists
1701 births
1784 deaths